Herminia Catalina Brumana (12 September 1897, in Pigüé, Argentina – 9 January 1954, in Buenos Aires, Argentina) was an Argentine teacher, writer, journalist, playwright and feminist activist with socialist and anarchist ideas. She wrote nine books and eleven plays, three of them published. She wrote for  Mundo Argentino, El Hogar and La Nación, among other periodicals. She actively participated as an anarchist and socialist. She was considered a disciple of Rafael Barrett.

Selected works

Prose 
 Palabritas, 1918.
 Cabezas de mujeres, 1923
 Mosaico, 1929
 La grúa, 1931
 Tizas de colores, 1932
 Cartas a las mujeres argentinas, 1936
 Nuestro Hombre, 1939
 Me llamo niebla, 1946
 A Buenos Aires le falta una calle, 1953

Theatre 
 La protagonista olvidada, 1933

Bibliography
Bellucci, Mabel (1994). «Anarquismo y feminismo. El movimiento de mujeres anarquistas con sus logros y desafíos hacia principios de siglo». Todo es Historia abril (321):  pp. 66–67.
Fletcher, Lea (1987). Una mujer llamada Herminia. Buenos Aires: Catálogos Editora.
Paniza, Delio (1954). Semblanza de Herminia Brumana. Buenos Aires: Montiel.
Rodríguez Tarditi, José (1956). Herminia Brumana, escritora y maestra. Buenos Aires.
Sámatan, Marta Elena (1974). Herminia Brumana, la rebelde. Buenos Aires: Plus Ultra.
Szlaska de Dujovich, Raquel (1987). Herminia C. Brumana en su proyección docente e intelectual. Buenos Aires: De la autora.
Wapnir, Salomón (1964). Perfil y obra de Herminia Brumana. Buenos Aires: Perlado.

See also
 List of Argentine writers

References

1897 births
1954 deaths
People from Buenos Aires Province
Argentine women writers
Argentine journalists
Argentine feminists
Argentine socialists
Socialist feminists
20th-century journalists